San Marino competed at the 2018 Winter Olympics in Pyeongchang, South Korea, from 9 to 25 February 2018. It was represented by one athlete, alpine skier Alessandro Mariotti.

Competitors
The following is the list of number of competitors participating in the San Marino delegation per sport.

Alpine skiing 

San Marino has qualified one male athlete.

See also
San Marino at the 2018 Summer Youth Olympics

References

Nations at the 2018 Winter Olympics
2018
2018 in Sammarinese sport